The Buford House in Napa, California, at 1930 Clay St., was built in 1877.  It was listed on the National Register of Historic Places in 1977.

It has Italianate or Romano-Tuscan style.

References

National Register of Historic Places in Napa County, California
Italianate architecture in California
Houses completed in 1877
1877 establishments in California